Bestway Group Limited is a British multinational conglomerate company based in London, England. It has its operations in United Kingdom and Pakistan.

The group owns the UK's second-largest wholesaler, Bestway Wholesale, serving 125,000 independent retailers and caterers from 64 warehouses nationwide. They also own the Best-one, Bargain Booze, Costcutter, Kwiksave and Central Convenience stores. Bestway is also well known for running the UK's third-largest pharmacy chain, Well Pharmacy, based in Manchester.

In Pakistan it is the largest shareholder of United Bank, while its subsidiary Bestway Cement is the largest cement-maker in Pakistan with a total capacity of more than 8 million tons per annum.

History
In 1976 Sir Anwar Pervez established Bestway Wholesale's first wholesale warehouse in Acton, West London. This was followed by warehouses in Southall (1981), Hackney (1983), Park Royal (1984) before expansion around the country.

In 2005, the Group acquired Batley's plc, and in 2010 purchased Bellevue and Martex. In April 2018, Bestway acquired the Bargain Booze and Wine Rack brands for £7m.

Operations

Wholesale and Retail

Bestway Group owns the UK's second-largest wholesaler, Bestway Wholesale, serving 125,000 independent retailers and caterers from 64 warehouses nationwide.

Bestway Wholesale also operates in the UK retail sector through a number of different branded outlets including Best-One, Bargain Booze and Central Convenience Stores. In December 2020 it was announced that Bestway would acquire Costcutter from Bibby Line. This acquisition gives Bestway 1,500 stores under multiple brand names including Costcutter, Co-Op, Kwiksave, Mace and Supershop.

Sainsbury 

In January 2023, it was announced Bestway Group Limited had acquired a 3.45% stake in the UK's second largest supermarket chain, Sainsbury's. A week later, in February 2023, it was announced Bestway Group had increased its stake to 4.47%.

Pharmacy

In July 2014 Bestway Group acquired the Co-operative Group's stores branded as The Co-operative Pharmacy, the UK's third largest pharmacy, for £620 million. They have since been rebranded as Well Pharmacy.

Cement

The Group set up its first Bestway Cement cement plant in 1995 in Hattar in the KP Province of Pakistan, with an initial investment of US$120.0 million. The plant's initial capacity was 0.99 million tonnes per annum, this was enhanced to 1.17 million tonnes per annum at a cost of US$10 million in 2002.

Bestway Group expanded its operations by setting up a 1.8 million tonnes per annum cement plant in Chakwal, Punjab Province, Pakistan, at a cost of US$180.0 million. Civil works for Bestway Chakwal-I were initiated in January 2005, the Kiln was fired in May 2006 and the plant went into production in June 2006. Though Bestway cement brought investment in Pakistan, the local people claim that Bestway Group did not fairly compensate the previous owners of the land. A case was brought against Bestway Group and is pending in the Supreme Court of Pakistan.

In May 2006 the Group announced plans for a second 1.8 million tonnes per annum capacity plant adjacent to its existing operations in Chakwal at a cost of US$150.0 million. To augment its presence in the cement industry, Bestway bid for 85.29% equity of Mustehkam Cement Limited. The Company's bid of approximately US$70.0 million was accepted in September 2005. The plant started production in December 2005 just one month after acquisition. In 2010 the production capacity was further enhanced to 1.1 million tonnes per annum at a total cost of US$70.0 million.

Over the last few years, Bestway's cement capacity has increased from 1.1 million tonnes to 6.0 million tonnes per annum; Bestway Cement is the largest exporter of cement to Afghanistan.

Banking

In October 2002 Bestway Group successfully bid for a controlling share in United Bank Limited (UBL). This was a total investment of approximately US$210.0 million. 
	
The bank has transformed itself from a loss-making static public sector entity into a profitable dynamic private enterprise. Profit before tax has grown from US$48.0 million in December 2002 to US$206.5 million in December 2010.

In 2005 for the third consecutive year the CFA Association of Pakistan conferred upon UBL's Investment Banking Group the ‘Largest Corporate Finance House’ award.
	
In February 2005 UBL became the first bank in South Asia to launch the EMV enabled credit card. In June 2005 with the launch of ‘UBL Money’ a fixed instalment personal loan product, UBL became the only bank in Pakistan to launch a complete suite of consumer financing products. In August 2005 UBL became the first bank to achieve the ‘Authorised Derivatives Dealer’ status in Pakistan.

As of December 2010 the bank's asset base had increased to US$8.5 billion, with UBL emerging as the second largest private bank in Pakistan.

Today, UBL has over 1,300 branches in Pakistan; a significant presence throughout the Middle East; Subsidiaries in UK and Switzerland; a branch in New York and Representative Offices in Beijing and Kazakhstan.

Bestway Foundation
In 1987 the Bestway Group established the Bestway Foundation. It is a charitable trust of the Bestway Group that works exclusively in the health and education sectors. Every year the Group contributes approximately 2.5% of its profit to the Foundation, which helps support charities and contributes to help the local community. In the last decade Bestway Foundation has invested in 35 inner city schools in as part of the Specialist Schools & Academies Program.

In 1997 Bestway Foundation Pakistan was established and Choudrey was appointed Chairman of Bestway Foundation Pakistan.

In February 2013, the Bestway Foundation and University of Bradford signed a five-year agreement that committed £250,000 each to jointly fund five annual scholarships to support postgraduate students applying from Pakistan.

In May 2014 Bestway Cement Limited was ranked 10th out of 478 PLCs by volume of donations in Pakistan according to Pakistan Centre for Philanthropy (PCP) Philanthropy Survey 2012.

In October 2014 Bestway Foundation (Rs. 50 Million)  and United Bank Limited (Rs. 100 Million) donated Rs. 150 Million to Foreman Christian College Lahore, Pakistan. FC College which is one of the oldest academic institutions of South Asia was founded in 1864 by Dr Charles W Forman, a Presbyterian missionary from the United States of America.

In May 2015 the charitable trust gave £1 million towards graduate scholarships at Oxford University. The gift created an endowment that enables two graduate students from Pakistan per year to study at Oxford, in perpetuity, through the Oxford-Sir Anwar Pervez Graduate Scholarships.

In October 2016, the Bestway Foundation and University of Kent signed a five-year agreement that committed £250,000 each to jointly fund five annual scholarships to support postgraduate students applying from Pakistan.

In February 2017 the UK's third largest retail pharmacist, Well Pharmacy, launched its charity partnership with the Stroke Association. Well seeks to raise £250,000 under Know Your Blood Pressure campaign for the country's leading charity dedicated to conquering stroke.

In November 2017, the Bestway Foundation donated £100,000 NSPCC the children's charity.

In March 2008 Well Pharmacy donated over 35,000 Foster Grant sunglasses and reading glasses, with a total estimated retail value of £946,000 to In Kind Direct, which distributes consumer goods donated by companies to UK charities.

In November 2018; the Group's charitable trust donated £100,000 to the Great Ormond Street Children's Hospital.

In Pakistan the Group has donated £900,000 towards the construction of dams and large scale water Reservoirs.

The company has donated £14.8 million to the charitable trust in the UK and provided over US$9.0 million to health, education and humanitarian causes in Pakistan.

In November 2019, Bestway Foundation donated £100,000 to the Save The Children - a charity that Bestway's charitable trust has been supporting since 2004.

In April 2020 the Group companies in Pakistan donated Rs.600 million to fight COVID-19 in Pakistan.

In July 2021 the Bestway Foundation donated £975,000 to the Gonville & Caius College, University of Cambridge to establish a £1.3 million Lord Choudrey Scholarship Fund to provide scholarships for PhD students; named in honour of Lord Choudrey.

Awards and nominations
In January 2013, Bestway was nominated for the Business of the Year award at the British Muslim Awards. The company is a longtime supporter of the UK Conservative Party.

See also

 List of companies based in London
 Fauji Foundation

References

External links
 Official Website

Conglomerate companies established in 1976
Companies based in the London Borough of Brent
1976 establishments in England
Conglomerate companies of the United Kingdom
Multinational companies headquartered in England
British companies established in 1976